Hymenophyllum is a genus of ferns in the family Hymenophyllaceae. Its name means "membranous leaf", referring to the very thin translucent tissue of the fronds, which gives rise to the common name filmy fern for this and other thin-leaved ferns. The leaves are generally only one cell thick and lack stomata, making them vulnerable to desiccation.  Consequently, they are found only in very humid areas, such as in moist forests and among sheltered rocks. They are small and easy to overlook.

Species

}}

, World Ferns accepted the following extant species:

Hymenophyllum abruptum Hook.
Hymenophyllum acanthoides (Bosch) Rosenst.
Hymenophyllum acutum (C.Presl) Ebihara & K.Iwats.
Hymenophyllum adiantoides Bosch
Hymenophyllum aeruginosum (Poir.) Carmich.
Hymenophyllum alveolatum C.Chr.
Hymenophyllum amabile Morton
Hymenophyllum andinum Bosch
Hymenophyllum angulosum Christ
Hymenophyllum angustum Bosch
Hymenophyllum antillense (Jenman) Jenman
Hymenophyllum apiculatum Mett. ex Kuhn
Hymenophyllum applanatum (A.M.Gray & R.G.Williams) Ebihara & K.Iwats.
Hymenophyllum apteryx M.Kessler & Sundue
Hymenophyllum archboldii (Copel.) C.V.Morton
Hymenophyllum armstrongii (Baker) Kuhn
Hymenophyllum asplenioides (Sw.) Sw.
Hymenophyllum assurgens M.Kessler & A.R.Sm.
Hymenophyllum australe Willd.
Hymenophyllum axillare Sw.
Hymenophyllum badium Hook. & Grev.
Hymenophyllum baileyanum Domin
Hymenophyllum balfourii Baker
Hymenophyllum barbatum (Bosch) Baker
Hymenophyllum bartlettii (Copel.) C.V.Morton
Hymenophyllum batuense Rosenst.
Hymenophyllum bicolanum Copel.
Hymenophyllum bivalve (G.Forst.) Sw.
Hymenophyllum blandum Racib.
Hymenophyllum bontocense Copel.
Hymenophyllum brachyglossum A.Braun ex Kunze
Hymenophyllum brachypus Sodiro
Hymenophyllum braithwaitei Ebihara & K.Iwats.
Hymenophyllum brassii C.Chr.
Hymenophyllum brevifrons Kunze
Hymenophyllum brevistipes Liebm.
Hymenophyllum bryoides C.W.Chen, Ebihara & K.Y.Cheng
Hymenophyllum bryophilum C.Chr.
Hymenophyllum caespitosum Gaudich.
Hymenophyllum caparaoense Brade
Hymenophyllum capense Schrad.
Hymenophyllum capillaceum Roxb.
Hymenophyllum capillare Desv.
Hymenophyllum capurroi de la Sota
Hymenophyllum cardunculus C.Chr.
Hymenophyllum caudiculatum Mart.
Hymenophyllum chamaecyparicola T.C.Hsu & Z.X.Chang
Hymenophyllum cocosense A.Rojas
Hymenophyllum compactum Bonap.
Hymenophyllum consanguineum C.V.Morton
Hymenophyllum copelandii C.V.Morton
Hymenophyllum cordobense (Hieron.) C.Larsen & Arana
Hymenophyllum corrugatum Christ
Hymenophyllum crassipetiolatum Stolze
Hymenophyllum crispatoalatum Hayata
Hymenophyllum crispatum Wall. ex Hook. & Grev.
Hymenophyllum crispum Kunth
Hymenophyllum cristatum Hook. & Grev.
Hymenophyllum cruentum Cav.
Hymenophyllum cuneatum Kunze
Hymenophyllum cupressiforme Labill.
Hymenophyllum darwinii Hook.fil.
Hymenophyllum delicatulum Sehnem
Hymenophyllum deltoideum C.Chr.
Hymenophyllum demissum (G.Forst.) Sw.
Hymenophyllum densipilosum A.Rojas
Hymenophyllum dentatum Cav.
Hymenophyllum denticulatum Sw.
Hymenophyllum dependens C.V.Morton
Hymenophyllum deplanchei Mett. ex Kuhn
Hymenophyllum devolii M.J.Lai
Hymenophyllum dicranotrichum (C.Presl) Sadeb.
Hymenophyllum digitatum (Sw.) Fosberg
Hymenophyllum dilatatum (G.Forst.) Sw.
Hymenophyllum dimidiatum Mett. ex Kuhn
Hymenophyllum diversilobum (C.Presl) Fée
Hymenophyllum eboracense Croxall
Hymenophyllum ectocarpon Fée
Hymenophyllum edanoi (Copel.) C.V.Morton
Hymenophyllum edentulum (Bosch) C.Chr.
Hymenophyllum elbertii Rosenst.
Hymenophyllum elegans Spreng.
Hymenophyllum elongatum J.W.Grimes
Hymenophyllum emarginatum Sw.
Hymenophyllum exquisitum T.C.Hsu & Y.S.Chao
Hymenophyllum exsertum Wall. ex Hook.
Hymenophyllum falklandicum Baker
Hymenophyllum farallonense Hieron.
Hymenophyllum feejeense Brack.
Hymenophyllum fendlerianum Sturm
Hymenophyllum ferax Bosch
Hymenophyllum ferrugineum Colla
Hymenophyllum fimbriatum J.Sm.
Hymenophyllum firmum Alderw.
Hymenophyllum flabellatum Labill.
Hymenophyllum flexuosum A.Cunn.
Hymenophyllum foersteri Rosenst.
Hymenophyllum foxworthyi Copel.
Hymenophyllum fragile (Hedw.) Morton
Hymenophyllum francii (Christ) Ebihara & K.Iwats.
Hymenophyllum frankliniae Colenso
Hymenophyllum fuciforme Sw.
Hymenophyllum fucoides (Sw.) Sw.
Hymenophyllum fujisanense Nakai
Hymenophyllum fumarioides Bory ex Willd.
Hymenophyllum fuscum (Blume) Bosch
Hymenophyllum gardneri Bosch
Hymenophyllum geluense Rosenst.
Hymenophyllum glaziovii Baker
Hymenophyllum gorgoneum Copel.
Hymenophyllum gracilescens Domin
Hymenophyllum hallieri Rosenst.
Hymenophyllum hastatum A.Rojas
Hymenophyllum heimii Tardieu
Hymenophyllum helicoideum Sodiro
Hymenophyllum hemidimorphum R.C.Moran & B.Øllg.
Hymenophyllum hemipteron Rosenst.
Hymenophyllum herzogii Rosenst.
Hymenophyllum hieronymi (Brause) C.Chr.
Hymenophyllum hirsutum (L.) Sw.
Hymenophyllum hirtellum Sw.
Hymenophyllum holochilum (Bosch) C.Chr.
Hymenophyllum horizontale C.V.Morton
Hymenophyllum hosei Copel.
Hymenophyllum humbertii C.Chr.
Hymenophyllum humboldtianum E.Fourn.
Hymenophyllum hygrometricum (Poir.) Desv.
Hymenophyllum imbricatum Blume
Hymenophyllum inaequale (Poir.) Desv.
Hymenophyllum integrivalvatum C.Sánchez
Hymenophyllum interruptum Kunze
Hymenophyllum involucratum Copel.
Hymenophyllum ivohibense Tardieu
Hymenophyllum jamesonii Hook.
Hymenophyllum javanicum Spreng.
Hymenophyllum jimenezii A.R.Sm. & M.Kessler
Hymenophyllum johorense Holttum
Hymenophyllum junghuhnii Bosch
Hymenophyllum kaieteurum Jenman
Hymenophyllum karstenianum J.W.Sturm
Hymenophyllum kerianum Watts
Hymenophyllum klabatense Christ
Hymenophyllum krauseanum Phil.
Hymenophyllum kuhnii C.Chr.
Hymenophyllum l´herminieri Mett. ex Kuhn
Hymenophyllum lamellatum Stolze
Hymenophyllum laminatum Copel.
Hymenophyllum lanatum Fée
Hymenophyllum lanceolatum Hook. & Arn.
Hymenophyllum latifrons Bosch
Hymenophyllum latisorum M.Kessler & A.R.Sm.
Hymenophyllum laxum (Copel.) C.V.Morton
Hymenophyllum ledermannii Brause
Hymenophyllum lehmannii Hieron.
Hymenophyllum leptocarpum Copel.
Hymenophyllum leratii Rosenst.
Hymenophyllum levingei C.B.Clarke
Hymenophyllum lindenii Hook.
Hymenophyllum lineare (Sw.) Sw.
Hymenophyllum lobatoalatum Klotzsch
Hymenophyllum lobbii Moore ex Bosch
Hymenophyllum longifolium Alderw.
Hymenophyllum longissimum (Ching & P.S.Chiu) K.Iwats.
Hymenophyllum lyallii Hook.fil.
Hymenophyllum macgillivrayi (Baker) Copel.
Hymenophyllum macroglossum Bosch
Hymenophyllum macrosorum Alderw.
Hymenophyllum macrothecum Fée
Hymenophyllum maderense Gibby & Lovis
Hymenophyllum malingii (Hook.) Mett.
Hymenophyllum marginatum Hook. & Grev.
Hymenophyllum matthewsii Bosch
Hymenophyllum maxonii Christ ex Morton
Hymenophyllum megistocarpum (Copel.) C.V.Morton
Hymenophyllum melanosorum (Copel.) C.V.Morton
Hymenophyllum microcarpum Desv.
Hymenophyllum microchilum (Baker) C.Chr.
Hymenophyllum mikawanum (Seriz.) Seriz.
Hymenophyllum minimum A.Rich.
Hymenophyllum mirificum Morton
Hymenophyllum mnioides Baker
Hymenophyllum molle C.V.Morton
Hymenophyllum mortonianum Lellinger
Hymenophyllum mossambicense (Schelpe) Schippers
Hymenophyllum multialatum C.V.Morton
Hymenophyllum multicristatum A.Rojas
Hymenophyllum multifidum (G.Forst.) Sw.
Hymenophyllum myriocarpum Hook.
Hymenophyllum nahuelhuapiense Diem & J.S.Licht.
Hymenophyllum nanostellatum Lellinger
Hymenophyllum nanum Sodiro
Hymenophyllum neocaledonicum (C.Chr.) Rouhan & C.Del Rio
Hymenophyllum nephrophyllum Ebihara & K.Iwats.
Hymenophyllum nitiduloides Copel.
Hymenophyllum nitidulum (Bosch) Ebihara & K.Iwats.
Hymenophyllum novoguineense (Rosenst.) K.Iwats.
Hymenophyllum nutantifolium Alderw.
Hymenophyllum obtusum Hook. & Arn.
Hymenophyllum oligosorum Makino
Hymenophyllum ooides F.Muell. & Baker ex Baker
Hymenophyllum ovatum Copel.
Hymenophyllum pachydermicum Ces.
Hymenophyllum pallidum (Blume) Ebihara & K.Iwats.
Hymenophyllum palmatifidum (Müll.Berol.) Ebihara & K.Iwats.
Hymenophyllum paniculiflorum C.Presl
Hymenophyllum paniense Ebihara & K.Iwats.
Hymenophyllum pantotactum Alderw.
Hymenophyllum parallelocarpum Hayata
Hymenophyllum paucicarpum Jenman
Hymenophyllum pectinatum Cav.
Hymenophyllum peltatum (Poir.) Desv.
Hymenophyllum penangianum Matthew & Christ ex Christ
Hymenophyllum perparvulum Alderw.
Hymenophyllum perrieri Tardieu
Hymenophyllum pilosissimum C.Chr.
Hymenophyllum pilosum Alderw.
Hymenophyllum platylobum Bosch
Hymenophyllum plicatum Kaulf.
Hymenophyllum plumieri Hook. & Grev.
Hymenophyllum plumosum Kaulf.
Hymenophyllum pluviatile Perrie & Brownsey
Hymenophyllum pollemonianum Rosenst.
Hymenophyllum polyanthos (Sw.) Sw.
Hymenophyllum poolii Baker
Hymenophyllum praetervisum Christ
Hymenophyllum prionema Kunze
Hymenophyllum proctoris C.Sánchez
Hymenophyllum productum Kunze
Hymenophyllum protrusum Hook.
Hymenophyllum pulchellum Schltdl. & Cham.
Hymenophyllum pulcherrimum Colenso
Hymenophyllum pumilio Rosenst.
Hymenophyllum pumilum C.Moore
Hymenophyllum punctisorum Rosenst.
Hymenophyllum pyramidatum Desv.
Hymenophyllum quetrihuense Diem & J.S.Licht.
Hymenophyllum ramosii Copel.
Hymenophyllum rarum R.Br.
Hymenophyllum recurvum Gaudich.
Hymenophyllum reinwardtii Bosch
Hymenophyllum revolutum Colenso
Hymenophyllum ringens Christ
Hymenophyllum riukiuense Christ
Hymenophyllum rolandi-principis Rosenst.
Hymenophyllum roraimense C.V.Morton
Hymenophyllum rubellum Rosenst.
Hymenophyllum rufescens Kirk
Hymenophyllum rufifolium Alderw.
Hymenophyllum rufifrons Alderw.
Hymenophyllum rufum Fée
Hymenophyllum rugosum C.Chr. & Skottsb.
Hymenophyllum ruizianum (Klotzsch) Kunze
Hymenophyllum saenzianum L.D.Gómez
Hymenophyllum salakense Racib.
Hymenophyllum sampaioanum Brade & Rosenst.
Hymenophyllum sanguinolentum (G.Forst.) Sw.
Hymenophyllum scabrum A.Rich.
Hymenophyllum secundum Hook. & Grev.
Hymenophyllum semialatum T.C.Hsu
Hymenophyllum semiglabrum Rosenst.
Hymenophyllum senterreanum Dubuisson & Deblauwe
Hymenophyllum seramense K.Iwats., M.Kato & Ebihara
Hymenophyllum sericeum (Sw.) Sw.
Hymenophyllum serrulatum (C.Presl) C.Chr.
Hymenophyllum seselifolium C.Presl
Hymenophyllum sibthorpioides (Bory ex Willd.) Mett. ex Kuhn
Hymenophyllum sieberi (C.Presl) Bosch
Hymenophyllum silvaticum C.V.Morton
Hymenophyllum silveirae Christ
Hymenophyllum simonsianum Hook.
Hymenophyllum simplex C.V.Morton
Hymenophyllum sodiroi C.Chr.
Hymenophyllum soriemersum Rouhan & C.Del Rio
Hymenophyllum splendidum Bosch
Hymenophyllum stenocladum (Ching & P.S.Chiu) K.Iwats.
Hymenophyllum subdemissum Christ
Hymenophyllum subobtusum Rosenst.
Hymenophyllum subrigidum Christ
Hymenophyllum superbum Morton
Hymenophyllum taiwanense (Tagawa) C.V.Morton
Hymenophyllum talamancanum A.Rojas
Hymenophyllum taliabense Alderw.
Hymenophyllum tarapotense Stolze
Hymenophyllum tayloriae Farrar & Raine
Hymenophyllum tegularis (Desv.) Proctor & Lourteig
Hymenophyllum tenerum Bosch
Hymenophyllum thuidium Harr.
Hymenophyllum todjambuense Kjellb.
Hymenophyllum tomaniiviense (Brownlie) Ebihara & K.Iwats.
Hymenophyllum tomentosum Kunze
Hymenophyllum tortuosum Hook. & Grev.
Hymenophyllum trapezoidale Liebm.
Hymenophyllum treubii Racib.
Hymenophyllum triangulare Baker
Hymenophyllum trichomanoides Bosch
Hymenophyllum trichophorum (Alderw.) Ebihara & K.Iwats.
Hymenophyllum trichophyllum Kunth
Hymenophyllum trifoliatum (L.) Proctor & Lourteig
Hymenophyllum tunbrigense (L.) Sm.
Hymenophyllum turquinense C.Sánchez
Hymenophyllum umbratile Diem & J.S.Licht.
Hymenophyllum undulatum (Sw.) Sw.
Hymenophyllum urbanii Brause
Hymenophyllum valvatum Hook. & Grev.
Hymenophyllum verecundum Morton
Hymenophyllum veronicoides C.Chr.
Hymenophyllum vestitum (C.Presl) Bosch
Hymenophyllum viguieri Tardieu
Hymenophyllum villosum Colenso
Hymenophyllum vittatum Copel.
Hymenophyllum walleri Maiden & Betche
Hymenophyllum whitei Goy
Hymenophyllum wilsonii Hook.
Hymenophyllum wrightii Bosch

Extinct species include:
†Hymenophyllum axsmithii  (Ypresian, Eocene Okanagan Highlands North America)

See also
 Trichomanes, the members of which are also called filmy ferns.

References

External links
Ferns of the genus Hymenophyllum observed in Cornwall
More complete list of species
Detailed photography of Hymenophyllum tunbrigense
Filmy ferns webpage of School of Biological Sciences, University of Auckland, New Zealand
J.E. Smith's original description of the genus online at Project Gutenberg

 
Taxonomy articles created by Polbot
Fern genera